The 1963 Copa Libertadores Finals was a football series between Santos and Boca Juniors on September 4 and September 11 of this same year. It was the fourth final of South America's most prestigious football competition, the Copa de Campeones (known in the modern era as "Copa Libertadores"). Defending champions Santos were appearing in their second consecutive final, whereas Boca Juniors were seeking to win the competition for the first time. Both finalists reached the final with relative ease as they crushed Botafogo and Peñarol.

Boca Juniors needed to win two group series to reach the finals. The Xeneixes progressed past the First round after winning three matches and losing only one, including a legendary 5-3 match against Olimpia which would repeat itself 26 editions later. As the defending champions, Santos begin their participation in the semifinals.

Qualified teams

Stadiums

Finals

First leg

Second leg

References

1963
1963
1963 in Argentine football
1963 in Brazilian football
l
l
1963 in South American football